Cathayacanthus is a genus of worms belonging to the family Rhadinorhynchidae.

Species:

Cathayacanthus bagarii 
Cathayacanthus exilis 
Cathayacanthus spinitruncatus

References

Acanthocephalans